In category theory, a branch of mathematics, the image of a morphism is a generalization of the image of a function.

General definition 
There exists a morphism  such that .
For any object  with a morphism  and a monomorphism  such that , there exists a unique morphism  such that .

Remarks:
 such a factorization does not necessarily exist.
  is unique by definition of  monic.
 , therefore  by  monic.
  is monic.
  already implies that  is unique.

    

Second definition 
In a category  with all finite limits and colimits, the image is defined as the equalizer  of the so-called cokernel pair , which is the cocartesian of a morphism with itself over its domain, which will result in a pair of morphisms , on which the equalizer is taken, i.e. the first of the following diagrams is cocartesian, and the second equalizing.

Remarks:
 Finite bicompleteness of the category ensures that pushouts and equalizers exist.
(Recall also that an equalizer is automatically a monomorphism).
 In an abelian category, the cokernel pair property can be written  and the equalizer condition . Moreover, all monomorphisms are regular.

Examples 

In many concrete categories such as groups, abelian groups and (left- or right) modules, the image of a morphism is the image of the correspondent morphism in the category of sets.

In any normal category with a zero object and kernels and cokernels for every morphism, the image of a morphism  can be expressed as follows:

im f = ker coker f

In an abelian category (which is in particular binormal), if f is a monomorphism then f = ker coker f, and so f = im f.

See also 
Subobject
Coimage
Image (mathematics)

References 

Category theory